České Heřmanice is a market town in Ústí nad Orlicí District in the Pardubice Region of the Czech Republic. It has about 600 inhabitants.

Administrative parts
Villages od Borová, Chotěšiny and Netřeby are administrative parts of České Heřmanice.

References

External links

Populated places in Ústí nad Orlicí District
Market towns in the Czech Republic